Khalnazar Agakhanov (25 February 1952 – 29 June 2013) was a politician and diplomat of the Republic of Turkmenistan. Born in Ashgabat, he served as the ambassador to Kazakhstan (1999–2000), Russia (2000–2012), Bulgaria (2009–2012), Germany and Latvia (2012 until his death). Agakhanov died from cancer in Berlin on 29 June 2013.

References 

Turkmenistan diplomats
Turkmenistan politicians
1952 births
2013 deaths
People from Ashgabat
Ambassadors of Turkmenistan to Russia
Ambassadors of Turkmenistan to Germany
Ambassadors of Turkmenistan to Kazakhstan
Ambassadors of Turkmenistan to Bulgaria